The 2009 Major League Baseball postseason was the playoff tournament of Major League Baseball for the 2009 season. The winners of the League Division Series would move on to the League Championship Series to determine the pennant winners that face each other in the World Series.

In the American League, the New York Yankees returned to the postseason for the fourteenth time in the past fifteen years, the Boston Red Sox made their sixth appearance in the last seven years, the Los Angeles Angels of Anaheim returned for the sixth time in the past eight years, and the Minnesota Twins returned for the fifth time in the past nine years. This would be the last postseason appearance for the Angels until 2014.

In the National League, the Los Angeles Dodgers returned for the fourth time in the past six years, the Philadelphia Phillies returned for the third straight year, the Colorado Rockies returned for the second time in three years, and the St. Louis Cardinals returned for the seventh time in the past 10 years. This would be the last postseason appearance for the Rockies until 2017.

The postseason began on October 7, 2009, and ended on November 4, 2009, with the Yankees defeating the defending World Series champion Phillies in the 2009 World Series. It was the Yankees' 27th title in franchise history, and their most recent title win.

Playoff seeds
The following teams qualified for the postseason:

American League
 New York Yankees - 103–59, Clinched AL East
 Los Angeles Angels of Anaheim - 97–65, Clinched AL West
 Minnesota Twins - 87–76, Clinched AL Central
 Boston Red Sox - 95–67, Clinched Wild Card

National League
 Los Angeles Dodgers - 95–67, Clinched NL West
 Philadelphia Phillies - 93–69, Clinched NL East
 St. Louis Cardinals - 91–71, Clinched NL Central
 Colorado Rockies - 92–70, Clinched Wild Card

Playoff bracket

Note: Two teams in the same division could not meet in the division series.

American League Division Series

(1) New York Yankees vs. (3) Minnesota Twins 

This was the third postseason meeting between the Yankees and Twins. The Yankees swept the Twins to return to the ALCS for the first time since 2004. The two teams would meet again in the ALDS in 2010 and 2019, with the Yankees sweeping both times, and the 2017 AL Wild Card Game, also won by the Yankees. Game 3 was the last postseason game ever played at the Hubert H. Humphrey Metrodome.

(2) Los Angeles Angels of Anaheim vs. (4) Boston Red Sox 

This was the fifth postseason meeting between these two teams. After four failed attempts, the Angels finally broke through and swept the Red Sox to return to the ALCS for the third time this decade. The Red Sox would not return to the postseason again until 2013.

National League Division Series

(1) Los Angeles Dodgers vs. (3) St. Louis Cardinals 

This was the third postseason meeting between the Cardinals and Dodgers. The Dodgers swept the Cardinals to advance to the NLCS for the second year in a row.

(2) Philadelphia Phillies vs. (4) Colorado Rockies 

This was the second and most recent postseason meeting between the Rockies and Phillies. The Phillies defeated the Rockies in four games to advance to the NLCS for the second year in a row. The Rockies would not return to the postseason again until 2017.

American League Championship Series

(1) New York Yankees vs. (2) Los Angeles Angels of Anaheim 

† Game 6 was originally scheduled to be played on Saturday, October 24, but was postponed because of rain.

This was the third postseason meeting between the Angels and Yankees, they had previously met in the ALDS in 2002 and 2005, both being won by the Angels. The Yankees defeated the Angels in six games to return to the World Series for the first time since 2003, effectively preventing an all-Los Angeles World Series from occurring. The Yankees won Game 1 by a 4–1 score, and then narrowly prevailed in a 13-inning Game 2 to go up 2–0 in the series headed to Anaheim. In Game 3, the Angels narrowly prevailed after 11 innings to cut the Yankees' lead in the series to one. In Game 4, the Yankees blew out the Angels by a 10–1 score to go up 3–1 in the series. The Angels narrowly prevailed by one run in Game 5 to send the series back to the Bronx, where the Yankees won by three runs to secure the pennant.

As of 2022, this is the last time the Yankees won the AL pennant. The Angels would not return to the postseason again until 2014.

National League Championship Series

(1) Los Angeles Dodgers vs. (2) Philadelphia Phillies 

This was the fifth postseason meeting between the Dodgers and Phillies. The Phillies once again defeated the Dodgers in five games to return to the World Series for the second year in a row, effectively preventing an all-Los Angeles World Series from occurring. Both teams split the first two games at Dodger Stadium. When the series shifted to Philadelphia, the Phillies blew out the Dodgers in Game 3, prevailed by one run in Game 4, and then blew out the Dodgers again in Game 5 to secure the pennant.

The Phillies would win their next pennant in 2022 over the San Diego Padres in five games.

2009 World Series

(AL1) New York Yankees vs. (NL2) Philadelphia Phillies 

This was the fourth New York-Pennsylvania matchup in the World Series (1927, 1950, 1960). This was also the second World Series matchup between the Yankees and Phillies. They previously met in the World Series in 1950, which the Yankees won in a sweep. The Yankees prevailed in six games, denying the Phillies back-to-back titles. It was the first championship for the Yankees since 2000.

The Phillies stole Game 1 at Yankee Stadium thanks to a complete game performance from Cliff Lee. Lee made MLB history in several ways: 

 This was the fourth postseason start of his career. In all four starts, he went at least seven innings and gave up no more than one earned run. The only other starting pitcher to accomplish such a feat was Christy Mathewson.
 He became the first left-handed starting pitcher to defeat the Yankees in the Bronx since Sandy Koufax in 1963 
 He was the first starting pitcher to throw a complete game without giving up an earned run against the Yankees in Game 1 of a postseason series 
 He was the first pitcher ever to strike out at least ten, walk no one, and give up no earned runs in a World Series start.

In Game 2, the Yankees evened the series off a solid pitching performance from A. J. Burnett. When the series moved to Philadelphia for Game 3, the Phillies jumped out to an early 3-0 lead, but the Yankees would score six runs in the fourth, fifth, and sixth innings to take the lead for good and take a 2-1 series lead. In Game 4, with the game tied at four runs each going into the ninth, the Yankees scored three unanswered runs in the top of the inning to prevail and take a 3-1 series lead. The Phillies held off a late rally by the Yankees in Game 5 to send the series back to the Bronx. In Game 6, the Yankees clinched the title with a 7-3 victory, and the Yankees' starting pitcher for Game 6, Andy Pettitte, added to his record of most postseason wins with his eighteenth victory.

With the win, the Yankees improved their World Series record against Pennsylvania teams to 3–1. To date, this is the last World Series win and appearance by the Yankees franchise, as during the next decade the Yankees failed to win a single American League pennant. The next year, the Phillies were knocked out in the NLCS the next year by the San Francisco Giants. They would return to the World Series in 2022, but were defeated by the Houston Astros in six games.

References

External links
 League Baseball Standings & Expanded Standings – 2009

 
Major League Baseball postseason